EMPIRE Distribution, Records and Publishing Inc. (marketed as EMPIRE) is an American distribution company and record label founded in 2010 by Ghazi Shami  with offices in New York City, London, Nashville, and Atlanta. It has released albums in various genres but it is predominantly focused on hip hop music. Many prominent companies and artists have partnerships with EMPIRE (see below), with music being distributed across platforms such as iTunes, Google Play, Amazon, Deezer, Spotify, SoundCloud, and Rdio, along with physical CDs and vinyl being distributed to traditional record stores.

EMPIRE has supported the debut albums and early singles of a number of early artists, frequently signing young talent. In the Atlanta scene, orchestrated by their SR. Marketing Executive , John Hill they were the first label to release Trinidad James, Rich Homie Quan, Migos, Rocko, and K Camp. In Los Angeles, they have distributed and/or are still distributing artists such as Kendrick Lamar, Schoolboy Q, Problem, Snoop Dogg, and Crooked I. They've also been involved in New York with releases from Fat Joe, Styles P, Cam'ron, and Busta Rhymes. On the R&B side, they have signed artists such as Eric Bellinger, Jacquees, Jesse Boykins III, Jonn Hart, and Lyrica Anderson. EMPIRE has also had several chart topping reggae albums including reggae artist J Boog's album Backyard Boogie.

A number of albums and singles distributed by EMPIRE have charted on Billboard, including "Taste" by Tyga featuring Offset, "Look at Me" by XXXTentacion, "All the Way Up" by Fat Joe and Remy Ma, "Broccoli" by DRAM, "Flex (Ooh, Ooh, Ooh)" by Rich Homie Quan, "Might Be" and "OTW" by DJ Luke Nasty, Malibu by Anderson .Paak, Section.80 by Kendrick Lamar, "Gas Pedal" by Sage the Gemini, Phantom and the Ghost by Styles P, "#IWantDat" by Mindless Behavior, Knock Madness by Hopsin, and Stoner's EP by Snoop Dogg.

History

Founding
EMPIRE was founded in 2010 by CEO Ghazi Shami, a music technology graduate of San Francisco State University and the former Director of Urban Music at INgrooves. In operating the company, Shami was joined by Nima Etminan, an MBA graduate in Media Management from Hamburg Media School. Etminan, co-founder of the hip hop platform DubCNN.com, worked to expand the mission and services and as of 2011 was handling Marketing and A&R. Etminan now serves as Vice President of Operations and A&R.

Releases
One of the label's first charting releases was Authenticity by hip hop duo The Foreign Exchange, released on October 12, 2010. It peaked at #145 on the US Billboard 200, and #23 on the US R&B chart. Rapper ScHoolboy Q's album  Setbacks, released on January 11, 2011, also charted, reaching #100 on the  Billboard 200. Longterm Mentality by Ab-Soul, released the following April, peaked at #32 on the US Billboard Top Heatseekers. In November 2013, Hopsin's Knock Madness album peaked at #76 on the Billboard 200 and at #1 on the Billboard Heatseekers chart.

Nima Etminan soon signed California hip hop artist Kendrick Lamar to the distribution company, and as of early 2012 Empire began handling distribution for all the projects by Top Dawg Entertainment, including Lamar's Section.80. Released on July 2, 2011, the album reached #113 on the US Billboard 200 and #1 on the Billboard Top Heatseekers Albums.

2012 saw releases by artists such as Slum Village, Trinidad James, Snoop Dogg, and Freddie Gibbs, several of which charted. In 2012 the label helped organize a 2013 tour between Trae tha Truth and J. Stalin. Also in 2013, Empire distributed the album Still Goin In (Reloaded) by Rich Homie Quan, which was named tenth best mixtape of 2013 by Rolling Stone. Recent albums include Phantom and the Ghost by Styles P, released on April 29, 2014. It charted at #74 on US Billboard 200, and #14 on US Billboard Top R&B/Hip-Hop Albums.

In 2013, Empire established its recording division, with Fairfield, CA native Sage The Gemini being the first signee.

In 2017, it was announced that Rayya Lioness launched a new Independent label called Lioness Music Style Records, LLC, which will be distributed by Empire. LMS Records is home to such artists as Albino Redz, BLK XLNZ, and more...

In 2018, it was announced that record producer and label executive L.A. Reid founded a new label Hitco Entertainment, which will be distributed by Empire. In the same year, Australian and rapper Iggy Azalea announced her own record label originally titled New Classic Records and later renamed to Bad Dreams with its distribution being handled by Empire.

On August 5, 2021, Blackground Records signed a distribution deal with EMPIRE to re-release its discography, most notably the catalogue of singer Aaliyah.

On January 23, 2023, EMPIRE announced a partnership with Web3 music investment platform Nebula.

Awards and nominations

Grammy Awards

|-
|  || "Out of Many, One Music" (Shaggy)|| Best Reggae Album || 
|-
|  || "Strictly Roots" (Morgan Heritage)|| Best Reggae Album || 
|-
| rowspan="6" |  || "Malibu" (Anderson .Paak)|| Best New Artist || 
|-
| "Malibu" (Anderson .Paak)|| Best Urban Contemporary Album || 
|-
| "All The Way Up" (Fat Joe & Remy Ma)|| Best Rap Performance || 
|-
| "All The Way Up" (Fat Joe & Remy Ma)|| Best Rap Song || 
|-
| "Broccoli" (DRAM)|| Best Rap/Sung Performance || 
|-
| "Rose Petals EP" (J Boog)|| Best Reggae Album ||

Artists
Notable artists who have released music on EMPIRE:

9th Wonder
2nd Nature
50 Cent
Aaliyah
Ab-Soul
A.Chal
Adam Lambert
Afgan
Alexis & Fido
Amanda Perez
Amber Liu
Anderson .Paak
Andre Nickatina
Asake
Bankroll Mafia
B-Legit
Berner
B.o.B
Bobby V
Benny the Butcher
Boosie Badazz
Black Sherif
BONES
Brockhampton
Busta Rhymes
Che’Nelle
Chronixx
Clyde Carson
Crooked I
Daz Dillinger
DRAM
Diamond D 
Dinah Jane
Dizzy Wright
DJ Kay Slay
DJ Pauly D
Doe B
Drakeo the Ruler
Dounia
Dru Hill
D Smoke
EarthGang
Emilio Rojas
Eric Bellinger
Ester Dean
Fashawn
Fireboy DML
Flipsyde
Freddie Gibbs
Glasses Malone
Hayley Kiyoko
Hopsin
Hustle Gang
Iamsu! 
Iggy Azalea
Jacquees
J Dilla
J. Valentine
Justina Valentine
Jacob Latimore
Jake Miller
Jarren Benton
Jesse Boykins III
Jewel
Jim Jones
Joji
Keak Da Sneak
Kilo Kish
King Von
Kizz Daniel
KiDi
Konshens
Kurupt
Kwengface
Lamont Sincere
Lil Duval
Lloyd
Lloyd Banks
Loote
Lyrica Anderson
Lucki
Mac Dre
MAJOR.
Mandy Rain
Mann
Mario
Mars
Members Only
Messy Marv
Mistah F.A.B.
Mitchy Slick
MO3 (rapper)
Mozzy
Mack Wilds 
NIKI
Nef the Pharaoh
Nefew
No Malice
Olamide
Philthy Rich
Pia Mia
Phresher
PnB Rock
Popcaan
Problem
Pleasure P 
Raisa
Rakeem Miles
Rapper Big Pooh
Rapsody
Rayven Justice
Riff Raff
RBL Posse
Remy Ma
Rich Brian
Rich Homie Quan
Robin Thicke
Rocko
Robb Banks
Rotimi 
Saba
Sean Garrett
Sean Kingston
Selfish
Shaggy
Show Banga
Skeme
Skyzoo & Torae
Slim Thug
SOB X RBE
SpaceGhostPurrp
Supa Bwe
Starlito
Styles P
Tank
The Alchemist
The Foreign Exchange
The Grouch & Eligh
The Jacka
Trae tha Truth
Travis Garland
Trevor Jackson
Trinidad James
Troy Ave
Turf Talk
Tyra B 
Tink 
Victoria Monet
WC
We Are Toonz
Wande Coal
XXXTentacion
Yaw Tog
Young Chop
Young Dolph
Yung Beef 
Yung Bleu
Zion I
Zion y Lennox
Z-Ro

Selected discography

G-Town BlackTrab

Singles

Notable singles released by EMPIRE

2011
Kendrick Lamar – "ADHD"
2012
Hopsin – "Ill Mind of Hopsin 5"
Trinidad James – "All Gold Everything"
2013
Alexis y Fido" – "Rompe La Cintura"
Problem – "Like Whaaat"
Rocko – "U.O.E.N.O."
Sage The Gemini – "Red Nose"
T.I. – "Memories Back Then"
2014
Busta Rhymes – "Calm Down" ft. Eminem
Rayven Justice – "Hit or Nah"
Rich Homie Quan – "Walk Thru"
Sage The Gemini – "Gas Pedal"
Troy Ave – "About The Money"
2015
Alexis y Fido – "Una en un Millón"
Colonel Loud – "California" ft. T.I., Young Dolph & Ricco Barrino
D.R.A.M. – "Cha Cha"
Jermaine Dupri – "WYA" ft. Bow Wow
Kane Brown – "Used To Love You Sober"
Nef The Pharaoh – "Big Tymin’"
P Diddy – "Finna Get Loose" ft. Pharrell
Popcaan – "Never Sober"
Rich Homie Quan – "Flex" (Ooh Ooh Ooh)
Rich Homie Quan – "The Most"
Tyga – "Stimulated"
2016
D.R.A.M. – "Broccolli" ft. Lil Yachty
Fat Joe & Remy Ma  – "All The Way Up" ft. French Montana & Jay-Z (Remix)
Lloyd – "Tru"
Luke Nasty – "Might Be"
Luke Nasty – "OTW"
Mario - "I Need More"
Mario – "Let Me Help You"
Wizkid – "Shabba" ft. Chris Brown, Trey Songz & French Montana
Young Dolph – "Get Paid"
2017
Sammie –  "Coa"
Lamont Sincere – "Where It Came From"
Eric Bellinger – "Be The Change"
Mario – "Pain is the New Pleasure"
Trinidad James – "Father FiGGA"
Lamont Sincere – "Broken"
Xai Beats – "Can't Relate" ft. Ellah & Young Gully
J-HAZE - "The Body Guard"
2018
Mario - "Dancing Shadows"
Mario - "Drowning"
Tyga - "Taste" ft. Offset
Dinah Jane - "Bottled Up" ft. Ty Dolla Sign and Marc E. Bassy
J-Haze - "Hussein on Cocaine" ft. Conway The Machine
2019
Adam Lambert - "Feel Something"
Iggy Azalea - "Sally Walker"
Mario - "Care for You"
Adam Lambert - "New Eyes"
Shapiro - "Urgent"
Shapiro - "Bleu Chanel"
Xai Beats – "Miss Me" ft. GreedyBoyFred, J.Star & 1.TakeOcho
Free Nationals - "Beauty & Essex" ft. Daniel Caesar & Unknown Mortal Orchestra
2020 
King Von - "Took Her To The O"
Young Dolph - "RNB" ft. Megan Thee Stallion 
T-Pain -  "Wake Up Dead" ft. Chris Brown
August Alsina - "Entanglements" with Rick Ross
Busta Rhymes - "YUUUU" with Anderson .Paak
T.I. - "Pardon" ft. Lil Baby
French Montana -  "Double G" ft. Pop Smoke
King Von - "The Code" ft. Polo G
Rich The Kid & YoungBoy Never Broke Again - "Bankroll"
Yung Bleu - "You're Mines Still" ft. Drake
Shapiro - "Fast Pace"
Shapiro - "Red Handed"
2021
50 Cent - "Part of the Game" ft. NLE Choppa and Rileyy Lanez
French Montana -  "Hot Boy Bling" ft. Jack Harlow and Lil Durk
Fat Joe - "Sunshine" (The Light) with DJ Amorphous 
Busta Rhymes - "Czar" ft. M.O.P. and CJ
Yung Bleu - "Ghetto Love Birds" with A Boogie Wit da Hoodie
Shapiro - "Never Change"
Shelley FKA DRAM - "All Pride Aside" with Summer Walker
T-Pain -  "I Like Dat" with Kehlani
OG Parker, Chris Brown - Rain Down ft. Latto and Layton Greene
Yung Bleu - "Baddest" with Chris Brown and 2 Chainz
Tyga -  "Mrs. Bubblegum" 
Sean Kingston -  "Love Is Wonderful" ft. Travis Barker

See also
2014 in hip hop music
List of record labels

References

External links

 
American record labels
Record labels established in 2010
Hip hop record labels
Record label distributors
Companies based in San Francisco
Record labels based in California
2010 establishments in California